"Gangsters and Thugs" is the first single by American punk rock/hip hop band Transplants from their sophomore album Haunted Cities, and their third single overall. It was produced by Tim Armstrong and Dave Carlock, and released via LaSalle Records/Atlantic Records in 2005. The single peaked at number 25 on the US Alternative Songs (Billboard) and number 35 on the UK Singles Chart.  

The song "Gangsters & Thugs" was written and performed by the Transplants (Robert "Skinhead Rob" Aston, Tim Armstrong, Travis Barker) featuring backing vocals from Richard Stites.

Track listing
adapted from Discogs
Note
†CD version of the single included a B-side song "Red Dawn", which is a non-album track.

Personnel

 Tim Armstrong - vocals, guitar, producer, executive producer
 Rob "Skinhead Rob" Aston - vocals
 Travis Barker - drums, loops, percussion
 Richard Stites - backing vocals
 Dave Carlock - synthesizer, keyboards, producer
 Kim Jade Fry - bass
 DJ Odie - scratches
 Neal Harrington Pogue - mixing
 Brian Knapp Gardner - mastering
 Eric Hellman - management
 Irving Azoff - management
 Jared Paul - management
 Estevan Oriol - photography

Charts

References

2005 singles
Transplants (band) songs
Songs written by Tim Armstrong
Songs written by Travis Barker
2005 songs